Kimberly Reed can refer to:

 Kimberly Reed, American documentary filmmaker
 Kimberly A. Reed, American lawyer
 Kimberley Reed, Scottish athlete